"You Won't See Me" is a song by the English rock band the Beatles from their 1965 album Rubber Soul. It was written by Paul McCartney and credited to Lennon–McCartney. As with songs such as "We Can Work It Out" and "I'm Looking Through You" from the same period, the lyrics address McCartney's troubled relationship with Jane Asher and her desire to pursue her career as a stage and film actress. The Beatles recorded the song during what author Mark Lewisohn describes as a "marathon" final recording session for Rubber Soul, to ensure the album's pre-Christmas release.

Canadian pop singer Anne Murray covered "You Won't See Me" in 1974. Her version was a top ten hit in both her native country and the United States. The track additionally appeared on her album Love Song.

Background and inspiration

"You Won't See Me" is about a crisis in McCartney's relationship with his then girlfriend, Jane Asher. Four years younger than McCartney, Asher was approaching twenty and no longer willing to adhere to his wish that she stay at home and put his interests first. In late 1965, while the Beatles were recording the album Rubber Soul in London, she had accepted an offer to appear in a stage production at the Bristol Old Vic theatre. After a heated argument, the couple had briefly ended the relationship. When he then attempted to telephone her in Bristol, Asher rejected him by not returning his calls. McCartney later said that it was "shattering to be without her".

Since 1963, McCartney had lived at the Asher family home, on Wimpole Street in central London. He recalled writing the song in the family music room, in the basement of the house. He said that the composition originated from "a two-note progression that I had very high on the first two strings of the guitar: the E and B strings", which he developed by playing descending semitones on the B string while letting the top string ring out. He described the song as "very Motown-flavoured" with a "James Jamerson feel". He drew musical inspiration for the composition from the Four Tops' "It's the Same Old Song", which was a hit single in the UK in late 1965.

During this period, McCartney also wrote "We Can Work It Out" and "I'm Looking Through You" as commentaries on his and Asher's relationship. The more biting tone of his lyrics marked a change from his typical love songs; in author Howard Sounes' interpretation, "You Won't See Me" presents McCartney as "bitter" and "the jealous boyfriend". McCartney later said of the band's approach to songwriting on Rubber Soul: "We'd had our cute period, and now it was time to expand."

Recording
The Beatles recorded "You Won't See Me" during the last day of recording for Rubber Soul – an all-night session that started at 6 pm on 11 November 1965. The deadline for completing the album was up, and the band needed to record three songs that night, in addition to finishing work on "I'm Looking Through You". As a result, they cut the song in only two takes. At 3:22, it was the longest track the Beatles had recorded up to this point. The fadeout is slightly longer on the mono mix.

McCartney played piano on the basic track and then overdubbed his bass part. The tempo gradually slows down throughout the song, a point that music journalist Robert Fontenot attributes to McCartney leading the performance on piano, rather than Ringo Starr's timekeeping abilities on the drums. In author Jonathan Gould's description of the song, the tempo appears to "drag" due to McCartney's "hyperactive Motown-style bass line". Mal Evans, one of the Beatles' roadies, is credited on the album sleeve as having played Hammond organ. His contribution consists solely of an A note held throughout the final verse and the coda. Gould also comments on the effect achieved by John Lennon and George Harrison's wordless backing vocals over the verses, saying that their voices represent "a pair of deaf ears" by "embodying the girl's indifference" to McCartney's complaints. Starr augmented his drum part with a separate hi-hat overdub, adding rhythmic accents throughout the song.

Release and reception
Rubber Soul was released on 3 December 1965 on EMI's Parlophone record label. "You Won't See Me" was sequenced as the third track, between Lennon's "Norwegian Wood" and "Nowhere Man". While the album was an immediate commercial success, some reviewers in the UK were unprepared for the artistic progression the Beatles had made in their musical arrangements and as lyricists.

In his review for Record Mirror, Richard Green wrote: "It is possible to say that Lennon and McCartney are the great songwriting team of the day and that Beatles performances are spot-on, but this LP cannot support that statement." He included "You Won't See Me" among the tracks that were "dull and ordinary" with "none of the old Beatles excitement and compulsiveness about them". Melody Maker said that the band's sound had become "a little subdued" and that songs such as "You Won't See Me" and "Nowhere Man" "almost get monotonous – an un-Beatle-like feature if ever there was one". By contrast, Nikki Wine (aka Eden) of KRLA Beat found the album "unbelievably sensational" and described "You Won't See Me" as "One of the greatest arrangements and blending of melodies by the Beatles ... and it has to be one of the best cuts on the disc."

Among more recent appraisals, Tim Riley says that the song's "antagonism can't help being tempered by [McCartney's] melodic suavity, so he winds up sounding like an innocent victim rather than a co-conspirator in a love affair"; similarly, the arrangement and the position of McCartney's vocal in the mix ensure that "the texture becomes more engaging than the emotion." Riley nevertheless admires the complementary aspect of McCartney's bass and piano contributions, adding of Rubber Soul as a whole: "without ever being intrusive, his bass emerges as an irreplaceable part of the overall texture. Because he virtually breathes melody, his bass lines begin to soar with inventive counterpoint to the band ..." Ian MacDonald says the song, like "Nowhere Man", "needed something to lift it" and rues the group's use of the "irritating 'ooh-la-la-la' backing-vocal formula". He concludes that, while it is "redeemed" by McCartney's fluid bass playing, "'You Won't See Me' soon founders under the weight of its own self-pity and expires long before struggling to the end of an unusually protracted fade." In his song review for AllMusic, Richie Unterberger finds the buoyant melody at odds with the dejected lyrics, but he praises the vocal arrangement, particularly "the brilliant interaction of counterpoint melodies" through the addition of Lennon and Harrison's harmonies.

Personnel
According to Ian MacDonald:

Paul McCartney – double-tracked lead vocal, bass guitar, piano
John Lennon – backing vocal, tambourine
George Harrison – backing vocal, lead guitar
Ringo Starr – drums, hi-hat
Mal Evans – Hammond organ

Anne Murray version

In 1974, "You Won't See Me" became a big hit for Anne Murray, reaching number 8 on the Billboard Hot 100 and number 1 on the Billboard Easy Listening chart. Lennon is said to have told Murray that her version of "You Won't See Me" was one of his favourite Beatles covers.

Murray later re-recorded the song as a duet with Shelby Lynne as part of her 2007 Duets: Friends & Legends album. A self-confessed Beatles fanatic, Murray covered several other songs of theirs as singles, including "Day Tripper" and "I'm Happy Just to Dance with You". The soulful backing vocals were devised by Murray's backup singer, Diane Brooks, and the bass line was devised by her bass player, Skip Beckwith.

Chart performance

Weekly charts

Year-end charts

References

Sources

External links

1965 songs
1974 singles
The Beatles songs
Songs written by Lennon–McCartney
Song recordings produced by George Martin
Songs published by Northern Songs
Anne Murray songs
Capitol Records singles